Pareuxoa nigrolineata is a moth of the family Noctuidae. It is found in the Los Lagos and Aisén Regions of Chile.

The wingspan is 40–45 mm. Adults are on wing from October to January.

External links
 Noctuinae of Chile

Noctuinae
Endemic fauna of Chile